Otto Junkermann (February 7, 1929 – July 27, 2016) was an American businessman from Green Bay, Wisconsin, and a former Republican member of the Wisconsin Assembly from the Sixth District (parts of Brown County).

In 2011, he ran as a "fake Democrat" in the Democratic primary against former Brown County Executive Nancy Nusbaum in the preamble to the recall election against Senator Robert Cowles. He lost by a wide margin.

References 

1929 births
2016 deaths
Politicians from Green Bay, Wisconsin
Republican Party members of the Wisconsin State Assembly